Anchusa barrelieri, Barrelier's bugloss or false alkanet,  is a species of plant in the Boraginaceae plant family.  It is sometimes used as an ornamental plant.

References

barrelieri
Garden plants